The Oval is an American political drama and soap opera created, executive produced, written, and directed by Tyler Perry, that premiered on October 23, 2019, on BET. The series chronicles the lives of a family placed in the White House by people of power, while also highlighting the personal side and everyday lives of the staff who run its inner workings.

A streaming television spin-off, Ruthless, premiered on BET+ on March 19, 2020.

Cast and characters

Main
Ed Quinn as Hunter Franklin, the President of the United States
Kron Moore as Victoria Franklin, the First Lady of the United States
Paige Hurd as Gayle Franklin, Hunter and Victoria's daughter (main season 1; guest season 2)
Daniel Croix Henderson as Jason Franklin, Hunter and Victoria's son
Javon Johnson as Richard Hallsen, the White House Butler
Ptosha Storey as Nancy Hallsen, the Butler's wife
Vaughn W. Hebron as Bartholomew "Barry" Hallsen, Richard and Nancy's son
Teesha Renee as Sharon Barry's former girlfriend and Kareem's current girlfriend
Lodric Collins as Donald Winthrop, White House Chief of Staff
Ciera Payton as Lilly Winthrop, wife of Donald
Taja V. Simpson as Priscilla Owens, White House residence staff supervisor
Walter Fauntleroy as Sam Owen, Secret Service Agent
Brad Benedict as Kyle Flint, Secret Service Agent
Travis Cure as Bobby, Lilly's friend
Matthew Law as Kareem Richardson, local pharmacy owner
Bill Barrett as Max Carter (main season 2–present; recurring season 1), Secret Service Agent
Derek A. Dixon as Dale (season 2–present)
Nick Barrotta as Allan (main season 3–present; recurring season 1–2), Donald's assistant and Ellie's ex-boyfriend
Kaye Singleton as Simone (season 3–present), the Second lady
Russell Thomas as Eli (season 3–present), the Vice President of the United States

Recurring
Melissa L. Williams as Ruth Truesdale/Denise Truesdale 
Russell Charles Pitts as Picky/Leon (season 1)
Maurii Davenport as Lindsay Yuma (season 1)
Ashley Monique Harper as Jean Peterson (season 1)
Yvonne Senat Jones as Tally (season 1)
Natasha Ward as Ellie Lyles (season 1–3) 
Gillian White as Diane Wilmont (season 1–2)
Janee Michelle as Maude, Victoria's mother (season 1–2)
Donna Feldman as Dr. Meadows

Episodes

Series overview

Season 1 (2019–20)

Season 2 (2021)

Season 3 (2021–22)

Season 4 (2022–23)

Production
On February 23, 2021, BET renewed the series for a third season, which premiered on October 12, 2021.

On March 22, 2022, BET renewed the series for a fourth season, which premiered on October 11, 2022.

Spin-off

On November 7, 2019, it was announced that BET+ ordered Ruthless, a spin-off starring Melissa L. Williams as Ruth Truesdale about a religious sex cult. The series premiered on March 19, 2020.

Storylines between The Oval and Ruthless
The pilot episode of Ruthless takes place alongside The Oval (the first two episodes) after Barry's daughter Callie is kidnapped by his ex-girlfriend Ruth, who is also the mother of Callie. Ruth arrives with three other members of a cult called the Rakudushis, who attacked the Hallsen residence. Their series storyline begins exactly after they left the house to arrive back at their camp.

In the 8th episode of The Ovals first season ("Eye on the Sparrow"), the cross-over scene goes forward in the proceeding five episodes parallel with the storyline of the 19th episode Ruthlesss season 2 ("The Raku Way") after a central character, who is a member of the Rakudushis, has escaped.

However, parallels with the storyline from episodes 13 & 14 of The Oval the second season of Ruth meeting with Barry have not yet matched with Ruthless. The storyline could most likely pair in the forthcoming second-half conclusion of the third season or the fourth season, and the timeline of The Oval 17th episode from season 2 could possibly minorly contradict events during Ruthless the third season where a Rakudushi member named Manny appears on The Oval in slight hairstyle difference (dreadlocks up-do, which was cut late season 2-Ruthless) and clothing appears in his first form of the purple cloth. Later, his clothing was changed to a military uniform, which would alter the timeline of events leading up to The Oval's such as Richard going to the Rakudushis' camp to try and rescue Barry after his kidnapping from Ruth, in which season 3 haven't addressed how Ruth was able to leave the camp after member Tally escaped, while it's possible the events could still match within the timeline onwards.

References

External links
 
 

English-language television shows
2010s American drama television series
2010s American political television series
2010s American black television series
2019 American television series debuts
2020s American drama television series
2020s American political television series
2020s American black television series
American television soap operas
American primetime television soap operas
American political drama television series
BET original programming
Television series about families
Television series created by Tyler Perry
White House in fiction
Television series by Tyler Perry Studios
Television shows set in Washington, D.C.